Air Vice Marshal Nigel James Colman,  (born 18 January 1971) is a senior officer of the Royal Air Force who has served as Commander of Joint Helicopter Command since March 2020.

RAF career
Colman was commissioned into the Royal Air Force (RAF) on 20 June 1991. As officer commanding No. 78 Squadron he saw action in Iraq and then in Afghanistan. He became station commander at RAF Benson as well as Puma and Merlin force commander in October 2012. He saw the Merlins leave the force in October 2014.

Colman went on to be Deputy Director of Military Support in July 2015, followed by a move to become the Head of Military Strategic Effects at the Ministry of Defence in April 2018 and Commander of Joint Helicopter Command in March 2020.

He was appointed an Officer of the Order of the British Empire (OBE) in the 2011 New Year Honours.

References

Living people
Officers of the Order of the British Empire
Royal Air Force air marshals
Royal Air Force personnel of the Iraq War
Royal Air Force personnel of the War in Afghanistan (2001–2021)
1971 births